Abacistis is a genus of moths of the family Yponomeutidae.

Species 

 Abacistis hexanoma - Meyrick, 1913 
 Abacistis teligera - Meyrick, 1914

References

Yponomeutidae